"The Bear Song" is a single by American comedy metal band Green Jellÿ. It is based on "The Bear Went Over the Mountain", an old popular camp traditional song, sung to the tune of "Sipping Cider through a Straw" from 1919.

Track listing

"Bear Dance (Jens Gad Psycho Radio Remix)" 3:13
"Bear Dance (Jens Gad Radio Remix)" 3:13
"Bear Dance (Jens Gad Video Remix)" 3:13
"The Bear Trance Dance (Extended Psycho Remix)" 6:41
"The Bear Song (Album Version)" 2:42

In popular culture

In the later part of 1994 "The Bear Song" was featured in the movie Dumb and Dumber during the Dante's Inferno dinner scene.
In 2010 "The Bear Song" was featured in a Royal Dutch Shell television commercial.
In 2014, Washington Nationals pitcher Aaron Barrett, nicknamed "The Bear", began using "The Bear Song" as his entrance music.

References

Green Jellÿ songs
1993 songs
American punk rock songs
Zoo Entertainment (record label) singles